Pat Ingraham (born April 29, 1950) is a Republican member of the Montana Legislature.  She was elected to House District 13 which represents the Thompson Falls area.

Personal life 
Ingraham's husband is Gerald. They have four children. Ingraham and her family live in Thompson Falls, Montana.

See also 
 Montana House of Representatives, District 13

References

External links 
 Pat Ingraham at ballotpedia.org
 Pat Ingraham at ourcampaigns.com

Living people
1950 births
Republican Party members of the Montana House of Representatives
People from Thompson Falls, Montana
Women state legislators in Montana
People from Derry, New Hampshire
21st-century American women